Mandel Bruce Patinkin (born November 30, 1952) is an American actor and singer, known for his work in musical theatre, television, and film. He is a critically acclaimed Broadway performer, having received three Tony Award nominations, winning for his leading role in Evita (1980), and seven Drama Desk Award nominations. For his work in television he has received seven Primetime Emmy Award nominations (winning one). He has also received a Screen Actors Guild Award, and three Golden Globe Award nominations. 

Patinkin made his theatre debut in 1975 starring opposite Meryl Streep in the revival of the comic play Trelawny of the 'Wells' at The Public Theatre's Shakespeare Festival. He then originated the role of Che in the original Broadway production of Andrew Lloyd Webber's Evita, in 1979, as well as that of Georges Seurat/George in Stephen Sondheim's Sunday in the Park with George, in 1984.

Patinkin is also known for his leading roles in various shows on television, playing Dr. Jeffrey Geiger in Chicago Hope (1994–2000), SSA Jason Gideon in the crime-drama television series Criminal Minds (2005–2007), and Saul Berenson in the Showtime drama series Homeland (2011–2020). For his work in television he has earned seven Primetime Emmy Award nominations, winning Outstanding Leading Actor in a Drama Series for Chicago Hope in 1995. Patinkin has had recurring roles in Dead Like Me (2003–2004) and The Good Fight (2021).

Over his career Patinkin has become known for his performances in film including his portrayal of Inigo Montoya in Rob Reiner's family adventure film The Princess Bride (1987). He also starred alongside Barbra Streisand in the musical epic Yentl (1983), where he received a Golden Globe Award for Best Actor in a Motion Picture Musical or Comedy nomination. His other film credits include Miloš Forman's Ragtime (1981), Warren Beatty's Dick Tracy (1990), Wonder (2017), and Life Itself (2018).

Early life
Patinkin was born in Chicago, Illinois, on November 30, 1952, to Doris Lee "Doralee" (née Sinton) (1925-2014), a homemaker, and Lester Don Patinkin (1919-1972), who operated two large Chicago-area metal factories, the People's Iron & Metal Company and the Scrap Corporation of America. His mother wrote Grandma Doralee Patinkin's Jewish Family Cookbook. Patinkin's cousins include Mark Patinkin, an author and nationally syndicated columnist for The Providence Journal; Sheldon Patinkin of Columbia College Chicago's Theater Department, a founder of The Second City; Bonnie Miller Rubin, a Chicago Tribune reporter; Laura Patinkin, a New York–based actress; and Louis Rosen, a New York–based composer.

Patinkin grew up in an upper-middle-class family, descended from Jewish immigrants (from Russia and Poland), and was raised in Conservative Judaism, attending religious school daily "from the age of seven to 13 or 14" and singing in synagogue choirs, as well as attending the Camp Sura in Michigan. His father died of pancreatic cancer in 1972.

He attended South Shore High School, Harvard St. George School, and Kenwood High School (later renamed Kenwood Academy, where his teachers included Lena McLin), and graduated in 1970. He attended the University of Kansas and the Juilliard School (Drama Division Group 5: 1972–1976). At Juilliard, he was a classmate of Kelsey Grammer. When the producers of the sitcom Cheers were holding auditions for the role of Dr. Frasier Crane, Patinkin put Grammer's name forward.

Career

1970s 
After some television-commercial and radio appearances (including on CBS Radio Mystery Theater in 1974), Patinkin started his career on the New York stage in 1975, starring in Trelawny of the 'Wells' as Arthur Gower. Patinkin starred alongside Meryl Streep, who played Imogen Parrott, and John Lithgow, who played Ferdinand Gadd. From 1975 through 1976, Patinkin played the Player King and Fortinbras, Prince of Norway in a Broadway revival of Hamlet, with Sam Waterston in the leading role. Patinkin had his first success in musical theater when he played Che in Andrew Lloyd Webber's Evita, which starred Patti LuPone, on Broadway in 1979.

1980s 
Patinkin went on to win the 1980 Tony Award for Best Performance by a Featured Actor in a Musical for his performance in Evita. He then moved to film, playing parts in movies such as Yentl and Ragtime. He returned to Broadway in 1984 to star in Stephen Sondheim and James Lapine's Pulitzer Prize-winning musical Sunday in the Park with George, in which he played the pointillist artist Georges Seurat and his fictional great-grandson George, earning him another Tony Award nomination for Best Actor in a Musical.

In 1987, Patinkin played Inigo Montoya in Rob Reiner's The Princess Bride, playing the role of the best swordsman in the country, looking to avenge his father’s death. Over the next decade, he continued to appear in movies, including Dick Tracy and Alien Nation.

1990s
On Broadway, Patinkin appeared in the musical The Secret Garden in 1991 and was nominated for the 1991 Drama Desk Award as Outstanding Actor in a Musical. He also released two solo albums, titled Mandy Patinkin (1989) and Dress Casual (1990).

In 1994, Patinkin took the role of Dr. Jeffrey Geiger on CBS's Chicago Hope for which he won an Emmy Award. However, despite the award and the ratings success of the show, Patinkin left the show during the second season because he was unhappy spending so much time away from his wife and children. He returned to the show in 1999 at the beginning of the sixth season, but it was canceled in 2000. Since Chicago Hope, Patinkin has appeared in a number of films. However, he has mostly performed as a singer, releasing three more albums. In 1995, he guest-starred in The Simpsons in the episode "Lisa's Wedding" as Hugh Parkfield, Lisa's future English groom.

Mamaloshen, Patinkin's musical production of songs sung entirely in Yiddish, premiered in 1998. He has performed the show on Broadway and in venues around the United States. The recorded version won a Deutscher Schallplattenpreis award in Germany.

In 1999, Patinkin co-starred in the second Sesame Street film, The Adventures of Elmo in Grouchland, as Huxley, an abusive, childish, sadistic, and greedy man with abnormally large eyebrows, who steals whatever he can grab and then claims it as his own.

2000s
Patinkin returned to Broadway in 2000 in the New York Shakespeare Festival production of Michael John LaChiusa's The Wild Party, earning another Tony Award nomination for Best Actor in a Musical. From 2003 to 2004, he appeared in the Showtime comedy drama Dead Like Me as Rube Sofer. In 2004, he played a six-week engagement of his one-man concert at the Off-Broadway complex Dodger Stages.

In September 2005, he debuted in the role of Jason Gideon, an experienced profiler just coming back to work after a series of nervous breakdowns, in the CBS crime-drama television series Criminal Minds. Patinkin was absent from a table read for Criminal Minds and did not return for a third season. The departure from the show was not due to contractual or salary matters, but over creative differences. He left apologetic letters for his fellow cast members explaining his reasons and wishing them luck. Many weeks before his departure, in a videotaped interview carried in the online magazine Monaco Revue, Patinkin told journalists at the Festival de Télévision de Monte-Carlo that he loathed violence on television and was uncomfortable with certain scenes in Criminal Minds. He later called his choice to do Criminal Minds his "biggest public mistake" and stated that he "thought it was something very different. I never thought they were going to kill and rape all these women every night, every day, week after week, year after year. It was very destructive to my soul and my personality. After that, I didn't think I would get to work in television again."

Patinkin spoke of having planned to tour the world with a musical and wanting to inject more comedy into the entertainment business. In later episodes of Criminal Minds, during the 2007–08 season, Jason Gideon was written out of the series and replaced by Special Agent David Rossi (played by Joe Mantegna). Gideon was later officially killed off, ending all chances of a guest appearance by Patinkin on the show.

On October 14, 2009, it was announced that Patinkin would be a guest star on an episode of Three Rivers, which aired on November 15, 2009. He played a patient with Lou Gehrig's disease injured in a car accident who asks the doctors at Three Rivers Hospital to take him off life support so his organs can be donated. He filmed an appearance on The Whole Truth that had been scheduled to air December 15, 2010, but ABC pulled the series from its schedule two weeks prior.

2010s
He starred in the new musical Paradise Found, co-directed by Harold Prince and Susan Stroman, at the Menier Chocolate Factory in London. The musical played a limited engagement from May 2010 through June 26, 2010.

Patinkin and Patti LuPone performed their concert An Evening with Patti LuPone and Mandy Patinkin on Broadway for a limited 63-performance run starting November 21, 2011, at the Ethel Barrymore Theatre, and ending on January 13, 2012. The concert marked the first time the pair had performed together on Broadway since appearing in Evita.

He costarred with Claire Danes on the Showtime series Homeland, which aired from 2011 until 2020. He portrays counterterrorism operative Saul Berenson, protagonist Carrie Mathison's (Danes) mentor. For his performance, Patinkin has been nominated for a Golden Globe and an Emmy Award, among other honors. Explaining what he learned from the character, he stated, "The line between good and evil runs through each one of us."

Patinkin was announced as playing the role of Pierre in the Broadway musical Natasha, Pierre & The Great Comet of 1812 starting August 15, 2017. He was to have a limited run through September 3, replacing former Hamilton star Okieriete Onaodowan, but Patinkin dropped out of the role before performing.

In 2018, Patinkin returned to recorded music with the album Diary: January 27, 2018 which was produced by pianist Thomas Bartlett.

In 2022, Patinkin was the narrator of the miniseries Indivisible: Healing Hate, a Paramount+ show documenting the events that lead to the insurrection of the Capitol on January 6, 2021.

Personal life
Patinkin married actress and writer Kathryn Grody on April 15, 1980. They have two sons, Isaac and Gideon. Gideon joined his father onstage in Dress Casual in 2011. Patinkin has described himself as "Jewish with a dash of Buddhist" belief. On the Canadian radio program Q, Patinkin called himself a "JewBu" because of this mix of beliefs and "spiritual but not religious".

Patinkin suffered from keratoconus, a degenerative eye condition, in the mid-1990s. This led to two corneal transplants, his right cornea in 1997 and his left in 1998. He was also diagnosed with and treated for prostate cancer in 2004. He celebrated his first year of recovery in 2005 by doing a  charity bike ride with his son, Isaac – the Arava Institute Hazon Israel Ride: Cycling for Peace, Partnership & Environmental Protection.

Patinkin has been involved in a variety of Jewish causes and cultural activities. He sings in Yiddish, often in concert, and on his album Mamaloshen. He also wrote introductions for two books on Jewish culture, The Jewish American Family Album, by Dorothy and Thomas Hoobler, and Grandma Doralee Patinkin's Holiday Cookbook: A Jewish Family's Celebrations, by his mother, Doralee Patinkin Rubin.

In May 2012, Patinkin delivered the opening speech at the Annual Convention of the Israeli Left, where he recounted his experiences during a visit to the West Bank with members of the Breaking the Silence organization.

Patinkin contributed to the children's book Dewey Doo-it Helps Owlie Fly Again: A Musical Storybook, inspired by Christopher Reeve. The award-winning book, published in 2005, benefits the Christopher Reeve Foundation and includes an audio CD with Patinkin singing and reading the story as well as Dana Reeve and Bernadette Peters singing.

On December 21, 2015, on Charlie Rose on PBS, Patinkin spoke about his recent trip to Greece to help refugees from war-torn Syria and his acting role in the television series Homeland. He stated that he wanted to help "create opportunity and better systems of living and existing, to give freedom, justice and dignity, quality of life to humanity all over the world."

In 2020, Patinkin's and Grody's son, Gideon, began filming and photographing their daily lives, posting images and clips to multiple social media outlets. The couple soon developed a significant social media following. Later that year, Grody and Patinkin partnered with Swing Left, creating viral videos with their sons to encourage people to vote for Joe Biden in the 2020 United States presidential election. Patinkin also stumped for Biden in an ad for the Jewish Democratic Council of America encouraging Jews to vote for Biden. The ad featured Patinkin channeling his Princess Bride character to encourage people to vote.

Patinkin is a model railroader.

Filmography

Film

Television

Theatre

Discography

Awards and nominations
Theatre awards

Film and television awards

On February 12, 2018, Patinkin received a Star on the Hollywood Walk of Fame at 6243 Hollywood Blvd for his work on television.

References

External links

 
 
 
 
"Mandy Patinkin: How I became political -- and why you should too" via CNN

1952 births
Living people
20th-century American male actors
21st-century American male actors
American Buddhists
American male film actors
American male musical theatre actors
American male Shakespearean actors
American male stage actors
American male television actors
American male voice actors
American people of Polish-Jewish descent
American people of Russian-Jewish descent
Audiobook narrators
Jewish American male actors
Jewish American musicians
Juilliard School alumni
Male actors from Chicago
Nonesuch Records artists
Outstanding Performance by a Lead Actor in a Drama Series Primetime Emmy Award winners
Tony Award winners
University of Kansas alumni
Patinkin family
Illinois Democrats